Following is a list of dams and reservoirs in Florida.

All major dams are linked below.

Dams and reservoirs in Florida

 multiple dikes, C. W. Bill Young Regional Reservoir, Tampa Bay Water
 Franklin Lock and Dam, on the Caloosahatchee River, United States Army Corps of Engineers
 Herbert Hoover Dike, Lake Okeechobee, USACE
 Inglis Spillway and Dam, Lake Rousseau, Florida Department of Environmental Protection
 Jackson Bluff Dam, Lake Talquin, City of Tallahassee, Florida
 Jim Woodruff Dam, Lake Seminole, USACE
 Lake Manatee Dam, Lake Manatee, Manatee County Utilities
 Munson Recreation State Dam, Lake Munson, State of Florida
 Moss Bluff Lock and Spillway, on the Oklawaha River, St. Johns River Water Management District
 Port Mayaca Lock and Dam, on the Okeechobee Waterway, USACE
 Rodman Dam, Rodman Reservoir, Florida Department of Environmental Protection
 Burrell Lock and Dam, on Haines Creek, St. Johns River Water Management District
 Apopka-Beauclair Lock and Dam, on Apopka-Beauclair Canal, St. Johns River Water Management District

References

External links

 
 
Florida
Dams
Reservoirs